Kadidal Manjappa (1908–1992) was the third Chief Minister of Karnataka (then, Mysore State) for a short period of time in 1956 (19 August 1956 – 31 October 1956).

He hailed from the village of Kadidal in the nature rich Tirthahalli taluk of Shimoga district from a Vokkaliga Community.  He did his graduation from the Maharaja's College, Mysore and obtained his law degree from the Poona Law college.

Manjappa was a freedom fighter and a true Gandhian who led many struggles in the state for probity in public life.  He served as a minister in various central and state governments for 32 years. He played an important role in initiating land reforms in the early 1950s by introducing laws related to the abolition of absentee landlordism and recognition to the right of cultivators. He is remembered for introducing the Tenancy Act. Several other progressive acts like the Inam abolition act came into being because of vision. He joined protests against emergency excesses in 1976 and later, headed the Karnataka state unit of "Congress for Democracy" floated by Babu Jagjivan Ram.

Manjappa had also penned three novels and an autobiography titled 'Nanasagada Kanasu' (An Unrealised Dream). The former Langford Road in Bengaluru has been renamed as "Kadidal Manjappa Road" in his honor. His centenary celebrations were held in 2008.

See also
 List of Chief Ministers of Karnataka

References 

 http://www.kla.kar.nic.in/assembly/elib/pdf/eresources/Kadidaal%20Manjappa.pdf
:kn:ಕಡಿದಾಳ್ ಮಂಜಪ್ಪ Kannada Biography of Kadidal Manjappa

Chief Ministers of Karnataka
People from Shimoga district
1908 births
1992 deaths
Maharaja's College, Mysore alumni
Chief ministers from Indian National Congress
Indian National Congress politicians from Karnataka
Congress for Democracy politicians
Mysore MLAs 1957–1962
Mysore MLAs 1962–1967
Mysore MLAs 1952–1957
Members of the Mysore Legislature